The 1950 Indiana Hoosiers football team represented the Indiana Hoosiers in the 1950 Big Ten Conference football season. The Hoosiers played their home games at Memorial Stadium in Bloomington, Indiana. The team was coached by Clyde B. Smith, in his third year as head coach of the Hoosiers.

Schedule

References

Indiana
Indiana Hoosiers football seasons
Indiana Hoosiers football